Luís Raposo (born February 21, 1955 in Lisbon) is a Portuguese archeologist and writer. He has published about two and a half hundred work up to the present. He is the President of 
ICOM Europe.

Qualifications and training 
Graduated in History from the Faculty of Arts, University of Lisbon (1977), archaeologist since 1980, he became a specialist in Paleolithic Prehistory. He was director of the  National Archaeology Museum, in Lisbon, between 1996 and 2012. He received a scholarship from the Calouste Gulbenkian Foundation as a participant in several scientific meetings and research work complementary to his doctorate, from January 1, 1994, to October 30, 1995.

In 2013, he participated by International Council of Museums (ICOM) in the Triennial Conference held in Rio de Janeiro

Professional performance 
He was chairman of the board of directors of the Professional Association of Archaeologists of Portugal in 1998–2000. He remained there as a member of the Board of the General Assembly, in 2000–2010 and as chairman of the supervisory board, between 2010 and 2012. 
 He was visiting scholar at the Faculty 
of Arts of the University of Lisbon between 2005 and 2014. As the member of the advisory board of the Portuguese National Commission of UNESCO, he has been involved in the establishment of local and regional archaeological museums in his country.

Deontology 
Luís Raposo thinks that the role of museums consists in defending national interest for the benefit of all citizens. As a democrat, he fights for the existence of a State that ensures justice, fair redistribution of wealth among people, public investment in education and culture, in short, a practice that implements advanced social policies in welfare state. According to him, "this can only be done with social engagement" and considers that the associated movement is one of the best forms of its expression, in particular in the fields of specialty. He basically follows, as "essencial misson", the Code of Ethics for Museums

European Mission 
As a critic of the cultural policies of prime ministers José Sócrates and Passos Coelho, Luís Raposo was fired by Coelho, in 2012, from the management of the National Archaeological Museum. As a result, he leaps forward and runs for the leadership of ICOM (International Council of Museums). Founded in 1946, ICOM is a non-governmental organization which "maintains formal relations with the United Nations Educational, Scientific and Cultural Organization (UNESCO) and has consultative status with the Economic and Social Council of United Nations". Thus, Luís Raposo "will lead the largest international museum organization, after winning the vote for the coordinator of the network of museums in France".

His election was largely majoritarian: 15 votes against 5 of his rival from ICOM-France, Bernard Blache, someone who excels in audiences. And so Luís Raposo becomes the coordinator of the 'French network of museums' and the center for the development of scientific, technical and cultural culture.

Being elected for a second term as President of ICOM-Europe, Raposo thanks ICOM Portugal for having proposed him as candidate and underlines that there was "almost unanimity": 15 national committees in Europe voted for him and only one voted blank. The vote took place as part of the parallel activities of the ICOM Triennial World Conference, which took place in Milan, Italy.

ICOM, the largest international organization of museums and museum professionals, is concerned with the preservation and dissemination of the world's natural and cultural heritage, "the present and the future, tangible and intangible", as read on its website. Currently, ICOM is made up of 119 national commissions, 30 specialized commissions and five regional commissions, including ICOM Europe

Awards 
 Honorable mention by the ‘National Environmental Prize’ instituted by the ‘Portuguese Confederation of Environmental Defense Associations’ (CPADA), 2010
 Honorary title Amicus Romaniae, awarded by the Romanian Cultural Center in Portugal, February 25, 2010

Other merits 
in Portuguese
 Alerts against the risks that threaten the archaeological heritage of Portugal, such as the Prehistoric Rock Art Sites in the Côa Valley.
 Co-author of the book entitled Um modelo sintagmático e transformacional do português contemporâneo (A syntagmatic and transformational model of contemporary Portuguese, Didáctica Editora edition, Lisbon, 1982.
 Author of the study / experiment "A certain way of celebrating Fernão Lopes", in "Escola Democrática" (magazine of the Direção Geral da Educação de Base), nº 33–34, pp. 21–25, Lisbon, 1980.
in English
 Neanderthals on the Edge – 150th Anniversary Conference of the Forbes' Quarry Discovery, Gibraltar
 Author of the study "The Middle-Upper Palaeolithic Transition  in Portugal", at "Neanderthals on the edge: 150th anniversary conference of the Forbes' Quarry discovery,Gibraltar”, pp. 95–109, Oxbow Books: Oxford.
 Co-editor (with N. Moloney e M. Santonja) of the volume "Non-flint stone tools and the Palaeolithic Occupation of the Iberian Peninsula", B.A.R. – International Series, number 649, ed. Tempus Reperatum, Oxford
 Co-editor of the compendium " On Community and Sustainable Museums  /  Museos Comunitarios y Sostenibles ", ed. EULAC Museums, 2019

See also 
 Collective memory
 Human sciences
 Anthropology
 Anthropology of art
 Ethics for Museums (See TEXT)
 International Museum Day

References

External links 
 ICOM Kyoto 2019 – 25th ICOM General Conference ("Museums as Cultural Hubs: The Future of Tradition”)
  European Museums: New challenges, new ways to build the future in the eve of the European Year of Cultural Heritage
 Luís Raposo – profile and publications at Research Gate
 Luís Raposo – four texts for downloading (pt), (en)
 Dating the Tejo river lower terraces in the Ródão area (Portugal) to assess the role of tectonics and uplift
 Great Dolmen of Zambujeiro in danger
 Middle Terrace Deposits of the Tagus River in Alpiarça, Portugal, in Relation to Early Human Occupation
 Middle Terrace Deposits of the Tagus River in Relation to Early Human Occupation
 VIDEO "folha de loureiro" (bay leaf = arrowhead) (pt)
 Luís Raposo, author at newspaper journal Público: articles online from October 2018 to January 2021 (pt)
 Articles online from February 2018 to January 6, 2021, at the site Património.pt (pt)
 Tagus River in Lisbon (illustrations)
 National Archaeology Museum, Portugal

 THE FUTURE OF MUSEUMS
 in 2021
 International Museum Day (named Day 2021; theme: recover and reimagine; date: May 18, 2021)

 

1955 births
Living people
Prehistorians
Portuguese archaeologists
20th-century archaeologists
21st-century archaeologists
20th-century Portuguese writers
21st-century Portuguese writers